Piperacetazine (Quide) is an antipsychotic prodrug, most notably used for schizophrenia. It is a phenothiazine derivative.

References 

Typical antipsychotics
Piperazines